Aleksandra "Sandra" Sałata is a Polish football defender, currently playing for Medyk Konin in the Ekstraliga. She is a member of the Polish national team since 2009.

References

1991 births
Living people
Polish women's footballers
Poland women's international footballers
Medyk Konin players
Place of birth missing (living people)
Women's association football defenders